The Minnesota State Academy for the Deaf (MSAD) is a public residential school serving deaf children in Minnesota, United States. It is one of two Minnesota State Academies in Faribault and operated by the state for particular student populations.

History
The Minnesota School for the Deaf and Dumb was established in 1863 with eight students enrolled. A department for the education of the blind was added in 1866. The name was changed to the Minnesota School for the Deaf in 1902. In 1986, the institution's name became the Minnesota State Academy for the Deaf (MSAD).

Two buildings are listed on the National Register of Historic Places, both designed by state architect Clarence H. Johnston, Sr.: the Administration Building/Girls' Dormitory, in a Georgian Revival style, and Noyes Hall, in a Classical Revival style. Frenchette Hall, the boys dormitory built in 1957, was demolished in 2015 and replaced in 2018 with Wilkins Hall, named after the first African American to graduate from the school, Blanche Wilkins Williams.

In 1992 Metro Deaf School (MDS), a charter school for the deaf in St. Paul, opened as many area parents wanted a closer option. This had the possibility of reducing the MSAD student body and/or making the student enrollment primarily from areas other than the Minneapolis-St. Paul metropolitan area.

Student body
Circa 1992, prior to the opening of MDS, about 50% of the students came from the Minneapolis-St. Paul area. In 1992 the expected enrollment for fall 1992 was around 190.

In 2002 most deaf high school students in the Minneapolis area either attended MSAD or attended local high schools with deaf interpreters. This was prior to the opening of Minnesota North Star Academy, which later merged into MDS.

Academics
MSAD is a bilingual school where the students are taught through American Sign Language and use English in writing and reading. It offers programs ranging from infants to high school specialized for deaf children.

Campus 
Preschool and elementary students are in Quinn Hall. Middle school and high school students are in Smith Hall.

Residency
MSAD is a residential school. It has two dormitories where students reside throughout the week. Students typically arrive on Sunday evenings and depart on Friday afternoons. Transportation is provided by the students' respective school districts. Parents can choose to pick up and drop off their child(ren) at the campus. Dormitories are for students who live more than 20 miles from the campus. Students who live within 20 miles of the campus are called "day students." MSAD residential programs offers extracurricular activities, peer interaction, student growth and development, achievement, and more.

Athletics
MSAD offers several athletics activities in all grade levels.

Sports for boys

Football
National 11 man deaf football Champ in 1950 and 1977.
Centennial Conference Champ in 1977.
National 8 man deaf football Champ in 1992, 1997, 1998, 2003, and 2012.
GPSD Champ in 1989, 1992, 1996, 1997, 1998, 2003, 2006, and 2012.
Cheerleading
Basketball
GPSD Champ in 1999, 2005, 2006, 2007, and 2012.
Clerc Classic Tourney - 3 wins and 3 losses
Track and Field

Sports for girls

Volleyball
Centennial Conference Champ in 1984.
Midwest/GPSD Champ in 1984, 1991, 1993, 1994, 1995, 1998, 2002, 2003 and 2004.
Basketball
National deaf basketball Champ in 1981, 1982, 1995, 1996 and 2005.
District 13 Champ in 1981–1982.
Centennial Conference Champ in 1981-1982 and 1982–1983.
Central States School for the Deaf (CSSD) Tourney - 26 wins and 5 losses - 7 time champs in 1980, 1981, 1982, 1983, 1984, 2004 and 2005.
Great Plains School for the Deaf (GPSD) Tourney - 43 wins and 10 losses - 17 time champs in 1992, 1993, 1994, 1995, 1996, 1997, 2003, 2004, 2005, 2006, 2007, 2008, 2009, 2010, 2011, 2012, and 2013.
Clerc Classic Tourney - 5 wins and 1 losses - 1 time champ.
Cheerleading
GPSD Champ in 1996, 1999, 2010 and 2011
GPSD Spirit Stick winners in 2008, 2010 and 2011.
Track and Field
GPSD Champ in 2002, 2003, 2004 and 2007.

MSAD original mascot was the Gophers. MSAD changed its mascot to Hilltoppers. In 1972, the students voted to change from Hilltoppers to Trojans because the students felt that Hilltoppers doesn't have a definite logo for its name.

MSAD belongs in the Great Plains School for the Deaf (GPSD) conference for football, volleyball, basketball, track and field, and the academic bowl competition. The Great Plains School for the Deaf conference was started in the fall of 1989 and contains Iowa School for the Deaf, Kansas School for the Deaf and Missouri School for the Deaf.

Trojans sporting events are hosted in either the Wesley Lauritsen Gymnasium or the Potter Field. Minnesota State Academy for the Deaf was host spike out 2015.

References

External links
Official website
Minnesota State Academy for the Deaf Alumni Association Website
July 1, 1996, through June 30, 2000 MSAD Audit Report
July 1, 2000, through June 30, 2004 MSAD Audit Report
July 1, 2004, through June 30, 2007 MSAD Audit Report

Public education in Minnesota
Educational institutions established in 1863
Buildings and structures in Faribault, Minnesota
Georgian Revival architecture in Minnesota
Public elementary schools in Minnesota
Public high schools in Minnesota
Public middle schools in Minnesota
Public K-12 schools in the United States
School buildings on the National Register of Historic Places in Minnesota
Schools for the deaf in the United States
Schools in Rice County, Minnesota
National Register of Historic Places in Rice County, Minnesota
Public boarding schools in the United States
Boarding schools in Minnesota
1863 establishments in Minnesota